Kings Of Mali is a post-bop/avant-garde jazz LP by Chico Freeman on India Navigation Records IN 1035 in September 1977 and released in 1978.

The lp, like many others recorded and produced by India Navigation in New York city, featured many of the top American players in post-bop and avant-garde jazz and features songs inspired by African history and the legacy of African Americans.

Criticism
Jazz critic Scott Yanow wrote: “(Freeman) stretches out on four of his colourful originals, which are dedicated to the ancient kingdom of Mali."

Background
Inspired by the history of the Empire of Mali, Chico Freeman printed an extensive section of research from “Sundiata Keita and Mansa Kankan Musa, Kings of Mali” on the back of the album jacket.

Track listing
"Look Up" (Freeman) – 11:28
"Minstrels’ Sun Dance" (Freeman)– 7:53
"Kings Of Mali" (Freeman) – 9:56
"Illas (pronounced “Eejas”)" (Freeman) – 11:04

CD Reissue
To date, there has been no CD issued of this recording.

Personnel
Chico Freeman -  tenor saxophone, soprano saxophone, flute, alto flute, bailophone
Jay Hoggard – vibraphone, bailophone,
Cecil McBee – bass
Anthony Davis – piano
Famoudou Don Moye - drums, percussion, bailophone, gongs, whistles

Production
India Navigation
Cover photo: Beth Cummins

References 

Chico Freeman albums
1978 live albums
India Navigation live albums